Holevo's theorem is an important limitative theorem in quantum computing, an interdisciplinary field of physics and computer science. It is sometimes called Holevo's bound, since it establishes an upper bound to the amount of information that can be known about a quantum state (accessible information). It was published by Alexander Holevo in 1973.

Accessible information
As for several concepts in quantum information theory, accessible information is best understood in terms of a 2-party communication. So we introduce two parties, Alice and Bob. Alice has a classical random variable X, which can take the values {1, 2, ..., n} with corresponding probabilities {p1, p2, ..., pn}. Alice then prepares a quantum state, represented by the density matrix ρX chosen from a set {ρ1, ρ2, ... ρn}, and gives this state to Bob. Bob's goal is to find the value of X, and in order to do that, he performs a measurement on the state ρX, obtaining a classical outcome, which we denote with Y. In this context, the amount of accessible information, that is, the amount of information that Bob can get about the variable X, is the maximum value of the mutual information I(X : Y) between the random variables X and Y over all the possible measurements that Bob can do.

There is currently no known formula to compute the accessible information. There are however several upper bounds, the best-known of which is the Holevo bound, which is specified in the following theorem.

Statement of the theorem
Let {ρ1, ρ2, ..., ρn} be a set of mixed states and let ρX be one of these states drawn according to the probability distribution P = {p1, p2, ..., pn}.

The quantity on the right hand side of this inequality is called the Holevo information or Holevo χ quantity:
.

Proof
Consider the composite system that describes the entire communication process, which involves Alice's classical input , the quantum system , and Bob's classical output . The classical input  can be written as a classical register  with respect to some orthonormal basis . By writing  in this manner, the von Neumann entropy  of the state  corresponds to the Shannon entropy  of the probability distribution :

The initial state of the system, where Alice prepares the state  with probability , is described by

Afterwards, Alice sends the quantum state to Bob. As Bob only has access to the quantum system  but not the input , he receives a mixed state of the form . Bob measures this state with respect to the POVM elements , and the probabilities  of measuring the outcomes  form the classical output . This measurement process can be described as a quantum instrument

where  is the probability of outcome  given the state , while  for some unitary  is the normalised post-measurement state. Then, the state of the entire system after the measurement process is

Here  is the identity channel on the system . Since  is a quantum channel, and the quantum mutual information is monotonic under completely positive trace-preserving maps, . These two inequalities give

On the left-hand side, the quantities of interest depend only on

with joint probabilities . Hence,

Meanwhile,  depends on the term

where  is the identity operator on the quantum system . Then, the right-hand side is

which completes the proof.

Comments and remarks

In essence, the Holevo bound proves that given n qubits, although they can "carry" a larger amount of (classical) information (thanks to quantum superposition), the amount of classical information that can be retrieved, i.e. accessed, can be only up to n classical (non-quantum encoded) bits. It was furthermore explicitly established, both theoretically and experimentally, that there are computations where quantum bits do indeed end up carrying more information than is possible classically. This is surprising, for two reasons: (1) quantum computing is so often more powerful than classical computing, that results which show it to be only as good or inferior to conventional techniques are unusual, and (2) because it takes   complex numbers to encode the qubits that represent a mere n bits.

See also
 Superdense coding

References

Further reading
 
   (see page 531, subsection 12.1.1 - equation (12.6) )
 . See in particular Section 11.6 and following. Holevo's theorem is presented as exercise 11.9.1 on page 288.

Quantum mechanical entropy
Quantum information theory
Limits of computation